Ukeme Markuss Eligwe (born April 27, 1994) is an American football linebacker who is a free agent. He played college football at Florida State and Georgia Southern, and was drafted by the Kansas City Chiefs in the fifth round of the 2017 NFL Draft. He also has been a member of the New York Giants, Tennessee Titans, New York Jets, and Oakland / Las Vegas Raiders.

Professional career

Kansas City Chiefs
Eligwe was drafted by the Kansas City Chiefs in the fifth round, 183rd overall, in the 2017 NFL Draft.

On September 1, 2018, Eligwe was waived by the Chiefs.

New York Giants
On September 3, 2018, Eligwe was signed to the New York Giants' practice squad. On October 16, 2018, Eligwe was elevated to the active roster. He was waived on May 6, 2019.

Tennessee Titans
On August 10, 2019, Eligwe was signed by the Tennessee Titans. He was waived on August 31, 2019 and was signed to the practice squad the next day. He was released on October 15.

New York Jets
On October 26, 2019, Eligwe was signed to the New York Jets practice squad.

Oakland / Las Vegas Raiders
On December 19, 2019, Eligwe was signed off the Jets' practice squad onto the Oakland Raiders' active roster.

Eligwe chose to opt out of the 2020 season due to the COVID-19 pandemic on August 4, 2020. He was waived after the season on March 1, 2021.

Personal life
Eligwe is of Nigerian descent. He is of the Ekpeye ethnic group in Rivers State, Nigeria.

References

External links
 NFL Draft bio
Georgia Southern Eagles bio

1994 births
Living people
American sportspeople of Nigerian descent
Players of American football from Atlanta
People from Stone Mountain, Georgia
American football linebackers
Florida State Seminoles football players
Georgia Southern Eagles football players
Kansas City Chiefs players
New York Giants players
Tennessee Titans players
New York Jets players
Oakland Raiders players
Las Vegas Raiders players